The Tongzhou mutiny, sometimes referred to as the Tongzhou Massacre, was an assault on Japanese civilians and troops by the collaborationist East Hebei Army in Tongzhou, China, on 29 July 1937, shortly after the Marco Polo Bridge Incident, which marked the official beginning of the Second Sino-Japanese War.

Background

In early 1937, Tongzhou was capital of the East Hebei Government, a Japanese puppet state controlling the strategic eastern district of Beijing. In July, a detachment of about 800 troops of the Chinese 29th Army, under the command of General Song Zheyuan and loyal to the Kuomintang government, camped outside the walls of Tongzhou. Refusing to leave despite the strong protests of the Japanese garrison commander, the Japanese did not know that General Song had reached an agreement with East Hebei leader Yin Ju-keng, who hoped to use Song's Kuomintang troops to rid himself of his Japanese overlords.

Mutiny

On 27 July, the Japanese commander demanded that the Kuomintang soldiers disarm. They refused, and fighting erupted the following day, in which the outnumbered and outgunned Chinese troops were trapped between the Japanese and the city wall. However, the Kuomintang Chinese troops' unwillingness to surrender in what was essentially a suicide mission strongly affected the Japanese-trained 1st and 2nd Corps of the East Hebei Army who were attached to the Japanese army. East Hebei Army units refused to press the attack, so Japanese troops bombed their barracks on the evening of 28 July. On midnight of 28 July, some 5,000 troops of the 1st and 2nd Corps of the East Hebei Army mutinied, turning against the Japanese garrison.

Causes 
There are several views as to the cause of the mutiny of the East Hebei Army.
 Revenge against Japan for the aforementioned bombing.
 Propaganda radio broadcasts by the Kuomintang which made them believe that the KMT had won at the Marco Polo Bridge.
 The conclusion of a secret agreement between the KMT and the East Hebei Government.
 Indignation at the flood of opium drugs countenanced by the East Hebei Government.

Aftermath
In addition to Japanese military personnel, approximately 260 non-Chinese civilians living in Tongzhou in accordance with the Boxer Protocol of 1901 were killed in the uprising. An American journalist who visited the site reported that 117 Japanese and 106 Korean civilians were killed; Chiang Kai-shek's private diaries (published in the 1970s) recorded 104 Japanese and 108 Korean casualties. Approximately 60 foreign civilians survived and they provided both journalists and later historians with firsthand witness accounts. The Chinese set fire to and destroyed much of the city.

Anti-Chinese sentiments were further intensified in Japan. The popular Japanese slogan in those days was "To punish China the outrageous",  or its shorter version . The Japanese military adventurists stationed in China used this incident to justify further military operations under the pretext of protecting Japanese lives and properties in and around Beijing. After World War II the Japanese defense team at the International Military Tribunal for the Far East (the Tokyo War Crimes Tribunal) submitted the official statement made in 1937 by the Ministry of Foreign Affairs of Japan as the inevitable cause of the Sino-Japanese conflicts, but presiding judge Sir William Webb KBE rejected it as evidence.

Gallery

See also 
 Second Sino-Japanese War
 Nikolayevsk incident
 Nanking incident of 1927
 Tonghua incident
 Jinan incident

Notes

References
 Hsu Long-hsuen and Chang Ming-kai, History of The Sino-Japanese War (1937–1945) 2nd Ed., 1971. Translated by Wen Ha-hsiung, Chung Wu Publishing; 33, 140th Lane, Tung-hwa Street, Taipei, Taiwan Republic of China. pp. 177–180, Map 2 

1937 in China
July 1937 events
Conflicts in 1937
20th-century rebellions
Empire of Japan
Military history of Beijing
Second Sino-Japanese War crimes
Massacres in China
Anti-Japanese sentiment in China
Mutinies
Chinese war crimes